Glen Isla is a rural locality in the Whitsunday Region, Queensland, Australia.

References 

Whitsunday Region
Localities in Queensland